George John Dufek (10 February 1903, Rockford, Illinois – 10 February 1977, Bethesda, Maryland) was an American naval officer, naval aviator, and polar expert.  He served in World War II and the Korean War and in the 1940s and 1950s spent much of his career in the Antarctic, first with Admiral Byrd and later as supervisor of U.S. programs in the South Polar regions.  Rear Admiral Dufek was the director of the Mariners' Museum  in Newport News, Virginia after his retirement from the Navy in 1959.

Background and military career
Born in Rockford, Illinois, he joined the Reserve Officer Training Corps (ROTC) at his local high school and was appointed to the U.S. Naval Academy in Annapolis, Maryland in 1921. Upon graduation in 1925 he received his ensign's commission and commenced his career aboard the battleship .  He was later assigned to the submarine USS S-39 and was promoted to lieutenant (junior grade) in 1928.

In 1932 he entered flight training school at the Naval Air Station Pensacola, Florida; after graduating as a naval aviator in 1933 he served as navigator and executive officer on three different ships.  He was promoted to lieutenant in 1935 and assigned to the aircraft carrier USS Saratoga in 1938.

During World War II Dufek commanded a flight training squadron, served as senior naval aviator in Algeria during the invasion of North Africa, assisted in the planning for the invasion of Sicily and Salerno and, after his promotion to captain and subsequent reassignment, the invasion of southern France. In September 1944 he assumed command of the escort carrier , which, on 24 April 1945, along with its escorts, sank the U-546, the last of 13 submarines (11 German and 2 Japanese) sunk by Bogue during World War II.

During the Korean War the Navy placed Dufek in command of the aircraft carrier  from 17 January 1951 – 6 May 1952.  Antietam operated off the coast of the Korean peninsula from October 1951 to April 1952 and received four battle stars.

Dufek was then given command of the naval installation on Kwajalein in the Pacific and, finally, the Naval Air Station Whidbey Island in Oak Harbor, Washington.

Dufek retired from the Navy on 30 June 1955 and was promoted to the rank of rear admiral in recognition of his wartime accomplishments the same day.  He continued to serve on active duty so he could participate in Operation Deep Freeze.

Antarctic experience

With Admiral Byrd
In the spring of 1939 Dufek, at this time a lieutenant, requested and received an assignment to Rear Admiral Richard E. Byrd's third expedition to Antarctica, which was officially named the United States Antarctic Service Expedition, where he served as navigator of the venerable , the flagship of the expedition. In recognition of his many hours of exploratory flying over the South Polar continent, Dufek later received the United States Antarctic Expedition Medal.

Operation Highjump
After a brief post-war stint in Japan, Dufek was assigned as chief staff officer to a U.S. Navy-Coast Guard task force to establish weather bases in the polar regions. While there he participated in Operation Highjump, a Naval expedition to Antarctica under the command of Admiral Byrd.  He served as commander of the Eastern Group (Task Group 68.3) which consisted of a seaplane tender, a destroyer and a tanker.

During Operation Highjump he made the first flight over the Thurston Peninsula and later led the rescue of six survivors of a crash of another flight (named George 1) over the same area.

He returned to Washington D.C. briefly, but by 1947 was back in the Antarctic, this time commanding a task force sent to supply existing weather stations and to establish new ones near the Pole.

Operation Deepfreeze
 In 1954 Dufek joined a special Antarctic planning group preparing for the Navy's Operation Deep Freeze, a scientific polar research expedition. When planning was complete Dufek was given command of Task Force 43 which, with more than 80 officers and 1000 enlisted men, three ice-breakers, and three cargo ships, was charged with logistics and support for the expedition.  Dufek's first flagship for the operation was the attack cargo ship USS Arneb.  He later transferred his flag to the icebreaker USS Glacier and was on board the Glacier when she completed a circumnavigation of the Antarctic continent later in the expedition.

Among other accomplishments, the task force established bases on Ross Island and in Little America, and on October 31, 1956,  Admiral Dufek and a crew of six, having flown on a ski equipped US Navy R4D-5 Skytrain named Que Sera Sera, became the first Americans to set foot at the South Pole and to plant the American flag, and the first men to land on the pole from the air. (Que Sera Sera is preserved at the National Naval Aviation Museum in Pensacola, Florida.)

On November 28, 1957, Dufek was present with a US congressional delegation during a change of command ceremony held at McMurdo Sound. After Admiral Byrd's death, Dufek was appointed to succeed him as supervisor of U.S. programs in the South Polar Regions.

Retirement and death
Admiral Dufek fully retired from the Navy in 1959.  He died in 1977, on his 74th birthday.

Namesakes
Antarctic features Dufek Coast, Dufek Head, Dufek Massif, and Dufek Mountain were named in his honor.

Awards

Additional Awards and Honors
 Golden Plate Award, American Academy of Achievement, 1961

Dates of rank
Midshipman – 16 August 1921
Ensign – 4 June 1925
Lieutenant (junior grade) – 4 June 1928
Lieutenant – 30 June 1935
Lieutenant Commander – 1 August 1939
Commander – 1 August 1942
Captain – 20 July 1943
Rear Admiral, Retired – 30 June 1955

Bibliography
Books by George John Dufek:
 1957: Operation Deepfreeze.  New York: Harcourt, Brace.  .
 1959: Through the Frozen Frontier: The Exploration of Antarctica.  Harcourt, Brace.  .
 1969:  Rear Admiral Richard Evelyn Byrd: A Biography.  Harcourt, Brace and the Virginia Institute of Marine Science, The College of William & Mary.

References

External links
 
George J. Dufek Papers at Syracuse University Library Special Collections Research Center
Guardian angel to the Commonwealth Trans-Antarctic Expedition 

1903 births
1977 deaths
People from Rockford, Illinois
United States Naval Academy alumni
United States Naval Aviators
United States Navy personnel of World War II
United States Navy personnel of the Korean War
Aviators from Illinois
American explorers
Explorers of Antarctica
United States Navy rear admirals
Recipients of the Navy Distinguished Service Medal
Recipients of the Legion of Merit
Chevaliers of the Légion d'honneur
Recipients of the Croix de Guerre 1939–1945 (France)
Military personnel from Illinois
South Pole